Little Fella is a 1933 British comedy film directed by William C. McGann and starring John Stuart,  Joan Marion and Hal Walters. It was made at Teddington Studios as a quota quickie.

Cast
 Marie Ault as Mrs. Turner 
 Glyn James as Bubblekins 
 Joan Marion as Cynthia Knowles 
 George Merritt as Detective 
 John Stuart as Major Tony Griffiths 
 Hal Walters as Dawes 
 Dodo Watts  as Pan

References

Bibliography
 Chibnall, Steve. Quota Quickies: The Birth of the British 'B' Film. British Film Institute, 2007.
 Low, Rachael. Filmmaking in 1930s Britain. George Allen & Unwin, 1985.
 Wood, Linda. British Films, 1927-1939. British Film Institute, 1986.

External links
 

1933 films
British comedy films
1933 comedy films
Films shot at Teddington Studios
Warner Bros. films
Quota quickies
Films directed by William C. McGann
British black-and-white films
1930s English-language films
1930s British films